ASV Dachau (Allgemeiner Sportverein Dachau) is a German men's volleyball club, based in the Bavarian town of Dachau. Currently it plays in the 2. Bundesliga, but in the past has won several national titles, and boasts appearances in European competitions.

History 
The team was founded as a volleyball department of largest Allgemeiner Sportverein Dachau eV, sports club founded in 1908 and has more than 3,200 members. The formation rose to national prominence in the nineties, when he served for several years in the 1. Bundesliga. In the top flight he won two league titles in a row, followed by the 1997 triumph in the German Cup.

With the win the national title in 1995 acquired the right to participate in the CEV European Champions Cup. The debut in the top European competition is blazing, and led the formation until the final act. In the Final Four played in Bologna, however, he was defeated by Las Daytona Modena. The title of vice-champion of Europe allowed the team to qualify to another club competition, the CEV Super Cup. Even in this event Dachau reached the final, and beat them was another Italian team, Alpitour Diesel Cuneo.

Despite these impressive results in Germany and Europe, the training went to meet a financial crisis, which made her go back to the second division, before regaining the top flight. A new corporate crisis occurred in 2002, and this time the team was forced to start from the Regionalliga. In later years he regained a place in the 3. Bundesliga.

Honours 

German League
 Winners (2): 1994-95, 1995-96
German Cup
 Winners (1): 1996-97
CEV Champions League
 Runners-up (1): 1995-96
CEV Super Cup
 Runners-up (1): 1996

External links 
 Official site

German volleyball clubs
Volleyball clubs established in 1975
Sport in Upper Bavaria
Dachau
1975 establishments in Germany